The Italian Gambit is a chess opening that begins with the moves:

1. e4 e5
2. Nf3 Nc6
3. Bc4 Bc5
4. d4

It is often played as an alternative to the quiet and closed lines of the Giuoco Piano or Giuoco Pianissimo openings. Black can:
 take with the pawn (4...exd4, a transposition to the Scotch Gambit, usually leading to the Max Lange Attack); 
 take with the knight (4...Nxd4), which is considered weak since it allows 5.Nxe5, attacking f7 with the bishop and knight; or 
 take with the bishop (4...Bxd4), which is considered best.

4...Bxd4 
After 4...Bxd4 5.Nxd4 Nxd4: 
 6.0-0, favoured by George Koltanowski, transposes to the related gambit line 4.0-0 Nf6 5.d4 following 6...Nf6, when 7.f4 and 7.Bg5 are the main possibilities for White; however, 6...d6 is an independent alternative for Black.
 6.Be3, dubbed the Miami Variation by Jude Acers and George Laven, is a way for White to deviate that probably suffices for dynamic . 
 6.f4 is considered dubious due to 6...d6.

See also
 Italian Game
 List of chess openings
 List of chess openings named after places

References 

Chess openings

he:פתיחה איטלקית
zh:意大利開局